The grande commande was a commission ordered by Louis XIV for statues intended to decorate the parterre d’eau of the gardens of the Palace of Versailles, as initially conceived in 1672. The commission, which included 24 statues and four groups, was ordered in 1674. Designed by Charles Le Brun from Cesare Ripa’s Iconologia, the statues were executed by the foremost sculptors of the day (Blunt, 1980; Friedman, 1988, 1993; Nolhac, 1913; Thompson, 2006; Verlet, 1985).

Owing to concerns of the effects of the vertical lines of the statues in relations to the garden façade of the château, the statues of the grande commande were transferred to other locations in the gardens in 1684 (Berger, 1985; Blunt, 1980; Friedman, 1988, 1993; Marie, 1968; Nolhac, 1901, 1913; Thompson, 2006; Verlet, 1985; Weber, 1993).

The 24 statues were personifications of the classic quaternities:

 The Four Humors of Man
 Melancholic
 Phlegmatic
 Choleric
 Sanguine

 The Four Parts of the Day
 Dawn
 Noon
 Evening
 Night

 The Four Parts of the World
 Europe
 Africa
 Asia
 America

 The Four Forms of Poetry
 Lyric
 Pastoral
 Satirical
 Epic

 The Four Seasons
 Spring
 Summer
 Autumn
 Winter

 The Four Elements
 Fire
 Air
 Earth
 Water

The four groupings represented the four classic Abductions:

 The Four Abductions:
 Persephone by Pluto
 Cybele by Saturn
 Orethyia by Boreas
 Coronis by Neptune

Sources 

Books

 
 

Journals

References 

Palace of Versailles